Quantock is an unincorporated area of Saskatchewan, Canada. According to a book titled Saskatchewan Ghost Towns, it was the location of a post office intended to serve isolated farmers and ranchers. Its mail route came from the nearby community of Assiniboia. It is located near the border with Montana, southwest of Regina.

External links
PrairieWiki entry

References

Ghost towns in Saskatchewan
Old Post No. 43, Saskatchewan
Division No. 3, Saskatchewan